Cerro Tenerife is a hill located in the state of Mérida in Venezuela. The hill has a height of more than 2,500 meters and takes its name from the island of Tenerife in Spain. Next to the hill is the so-called Quebrada Tenerife, an intermittent stream.

See also 
 Geography of Venezuela

References 

Geography of Mérida (state)
Mountains of Venezuela
Mérida (state)